Netochka Nezvanova may refer to:

Netochka Nezvanova (novel), unfinished novel by Russian author Fyodor Dostoyevsky
Netochka Nezvanova (author), pseudonym used by author(s) of the software Nato.0+55+3d